Prunella (1788 – December 1811) was a British Thoroughbred racehorse. Raced from 1791 to 1794, she won three races including a Sweepstakes of 200 guineas each at Newmarket. She was retired to stud and became an influential broodmare, foaling Epsom Derby winner Pope and Epsom Oaks winner Pelisse. Her daughters also went on to become top broodmares in their own right. She was owned by Augustus FitzRoy, 3rd Duke of Grafton.

Background
Prunella was a bay filly bred by the 3rd Duke of Grafton and foaled in 1788. She was sired by the undefeated Great Subscription Purse winner Highflyer. Highflyer was also a top stallion, becoming Champion sire thirteen times. He sired three Epsom Derby winners in Noble, Sir Peter Teazle and Skyscraper along with several other classic winners. Sir Peter Teazle also became an important stallion. Prunella's dam was Promise, a daughter of Champion sire Snap.

Racing career

1791: Three-year-old season
Prunella made her racecourse debut at Epsom Downs on 10 June 1791, when she finished unplaced behind winner Portia in the Oaks Stakes. Her next race came in October at Newmarket, where she faced two opponents in a Sweepskates of 200 guineas each over two miles. Baron Foley's colt Vermin started as the odds on favourite, with both Prunella and Mopsey priced at 4/1. Prunella won the race, with Vermin finishing second. Two weeks later she lost a match race against Earl Grosvenor's filly Sylph worth 200 guineas, with both fillies carrying the same weight.

1792: Four-year-old season
In April 1792 Prunella beat Mopsey at Newmarket for 25 guineas. At the Newmarket Second October meeting she lost to Sir John Lade's Clifden in a Sweepstakes of 25 guineas each. At the Houghton meeting she raced against six rivals in a Handicap Sweepstakes of 50 guineas each. The race was won by Mystery, with Speculator in finishing in second and Prunella in third place. Her final race of the season came in a £50 Handicap Plate at Newmarket. Prunella finished the race in third place of the twelve runners. Sir Frank Standish's filly Fairy won the race and Quetlavaca finished second.

1793: Five-year-old season
Her first race as a five-year-old was the King's Plate for mares at Newmarket in April 1793. She finished second to the Earl of Clermont's filly Peggy, beating Amelia, Kezia and Magnolia. Her only other race of the season was at Huntingdon, where she faced two rivals in a £50 race comprising two four-mile heats. Prunella won both heats, with Bustler finishing second in both and Pill-box last.

1794: Six-year-old season
At the Newmarket Craven meeting in April 1794 she finished unplaced behind winner Lurcher in the first class of the Oatlands Stakes. Her final race came at Newmarket's First Spring meeting in early May in the King's Plate for 100 guineas. Peggy started as the 4/6 favourite, with Kezia at 4/1, Prunella at 6/1 and Gipsy at 12/1. Peggy won the race from Prunella, with Gipsy third and Kezia last of the four runners.

Stud career
 
Retired to stud after the 1794 season, Prunella became a very influential broodmare. Only one of her daughters that lived to produce a foal failed to produce a classic winner. In total she produced twelve foals. They were:

           

Prunella died in December 1811 at the Duke of Grafton's stud at Euston in Suffolk.

Pedigree

Note: b. = Bay, br. = Brown

* Prunella was inbred 3x3 to Blank. This means that the stallion appears twice in the third generation of her pedigree. She was also inbred 4x4 to Partner.

References

1788 racehorse births
1811 racehorse deaths
Racehorses bred in the Kingdom of Great Britain
Racehorses trained in the Kingdom of Great Britain
Byerley Turk sire line
Thoroughbred family 1-d
Thoroughbred family 1-e